Lansingburgh was a village in the north end of Troy. It was first laid out in lots and incorporated in 1771 by Abraham Jacob Lansing, who had purchased the land in 1763. In 1900, Lansingburgh became part of the City of Troy.

Demographics

Lansingburgh has had a predominantly working class Irish Neighborhood since the late 1880s.
In the 12182 zip code 71% of residents are Non-Hispanic White, 17% Non Hispanic Black or African American, 9% Hispanic or Latino and 3% other. Top Ancestries reported in the zip code 12182 are 22% Irish, 13% African American, 8% Italian, 7% French, 6% Puerto Rican and 3% Trinidadian. The Median Household Income for this zip is 31,321. 35.5% of the population is living below the poverty line.

As of 2015, the Lansingburgh Central School District has an 87% graduation rate for the Senior High School. This is higher than most other local urban school districts. 65% of students in the district are economically disadvantaged. The district is 67% Non-Hispanic White, 17% Black, 10% Hispanic, 5% Multi-Racial and 1% Asian.

Lansingburgh has its own school district as well as post office, but police, fire, and public works are part of the City of Troy.

History

Landmarks

Herman Melville lived in what is now known as the Herman Melville House from 1838 to 1847. It currently serves as headquarters of the Lansingburgh Historical Society. It was listed on the National Register of Historic Places in 1992.

The Powers Home, built in 1846, was listed on the National Register of Historic Places  in 1974.

The Lansingburgh Academy was listed on the National Register of Historic Places in 1976.

The Trinity Church was listed on the National Register of Historic Places in 1995.

The Lansingburgh Village Burial Ground was listed on the National Register of Historic Places in 2002.

The Haskell School was listed on the National Register of Historic Places in 2002.

The Jacob H. Patten House was listed on the National Register of Historic Places in 2016.

Notable people
 Chester A. Arthur (1829–1886), 21st President of the United States, born in Fairfield, Vermont, spent part of his youth in Lansingburgh.
Catcher Fatty Briody was a 19th-century Major League Baseball player from Lansingburgh.
William Brayton, a Justice of the Vermont Supreme Court, was born in Lansingburgh.
Edward Burton Hughes, the Acting Commissioner of New York State Department of Transportation in 1969, Executive Deputy Commissioner of New York State Department of Transportation from 1967 to 1970, and Deputy Superintendent of New York State Department of Public Works from 1952 to 1967. Upon his retirement in 1970 Hughes founded the E. Burton Hughes Achievement Award.
 George Tracy Marsh (1875–1945), author of works often set in the Canadian wilderness.
 Moby-Dick author Herman Melville wrote his first two novels in Lansingburgh.  He resided at what is now known as the Herman Melville House from 1838 to 1847, which currently serves as headquarters of the Lansingburgh Historical Society.
 Children's author Mary Louise Peebles (1833–1915) was born, raised and died in Lansingburgh.

References

External links 

Lansingburgh Historical Society website
 Early history of Lansingburgh, NY

Populated places in Rensselaer County, New York
Former towns in New York (state)
Former villages in New York (state)
Troy, New York
1807 establishments in New York (state)
Populated places established in 1807